Oomakkuyil Padumbol is a 2012 Indian Malayalam-language children's film produced and directed by Siddique Chennamangalloor, starring Malavika Nair, Akash Roshan, Shankar and  Sangeetha Rajendran.

Plot
The story is about Reema (Malavika Nair), a young Muslim schoolgirl in Malabar, who loved Malayalam and poetry. The film is about her mental trauma once she was moved to an English medium school by her parents, for their social status.

Cast
 Malavika Nair as Rima Mansoor
 Akash Roshan as Roshan
 Shankar as Doctor
 Sangita Rajendran as Zeenath/Rima's mother
 Nilambur Ayisha as Valiyumma/Rima's granmothermother
 Dhanraj as Rahman
Dolly as Geetha

Awards
Kerala State Film Awards
 Nilambur Aisha - Second Best Actress
 Malavika Nair - Best Child Artist

 Kerala Film Critics Awards
 Special Jury Prize: Oomakkuyil Padumbol
 Best Debutant Director: Siddique Chendamangalloor
 Best Child Artist – Female: Malavika Nair
 Best Playback Singer – Male: Vidhu Prathap

References

2010s Malayalam-language films
Indian children's films